Oswaldo Viveiros Montenegro (Rio de Janeiro, March 15, 1956) is a Brazilian musician. In addition to being a singer, Montenegro has composed soundtracks for plays, ballets, film, and television and was married to actress Paloma Duarte. It has one of the stronger partnerships MPB beside Madalena Salles, accompanying with their flutes.

Discography
Sem Mandamentos (1975) Som Livre Compacto simple
Trilhas (1977) Independente LP
Poeta maldito... Moleque vadio (1979) WEA LP, CD
Oswaldo Montenegro (1980) WEA LP, CD
Asa de Luz (1981) WEA LP
A Dança dos Signos (1983) Philips LP
Cristal. Trilha sonora da peça (1983) PolyGram LP
Brincando em cima daquilo (1984) LP
Drops de Hortelã. Oswaldo Montenegro e Glória Pires (1985) PolyGram LP
Os Menestréis (1986) Independente LP
Aldeia dos Ventos (1987) Independente LP
Oswaldo Montenegro ao vivo (1989) Som Livre LP, CD
Oswaldo Montenegro (1990) Som Livre CD
Vida de Artista (1991) Som Livre LP, CD
Mulungo (1992) Som Livre CD
Seu Francisco (1992) PolyGram CD
Aos filhos dos hippies (1995) Albatroz CD
O Vale Encantado (1997) Albatroz CD
Noturno (1997) Independente CD
Letras Brasileiras (1997) Albatroz CD 	Léo e Bia (1998) Albatroz CD
Aldeia dos Ventos. Arte em construção (1998) Albatroz CD
A Dança dos Signos 15 anos (1999) Independente CD
Letras Brasileiras ao vivo (1999) Albatroz CD
A lista (1999) Independente CD
A lista. Trilha sonora do musical (1999) Independente CD
A lista (1999) Independente single
Letras brasileiras ao vivo (1999) Albatroz CD
Escondido no tempo (1999) Panela Music CD
Telas. Só para colecionadores (2000) Independente CD
Entre uma balada e um blues (2001) Ouver Records CD
A lista (2001) Jam Music CD
Estrada nova (2002) Jam Music CD
Letras brasileiras II (2003) Albatroz CD
Aldeia dos ventos (2004) Jam Music CD
Ao vivo - 25 anos (2004) Warner CD and DVD
Léo e Bia 1973 (2005) Jam Music CD
A partir de agora (2006) Wea CD and DVD
Intimidade (2008) Som Livre CD and DVD
Quebra-cabeça Elétrico (2009) DVD
Canções De Amor (2010) CD
De Passagem (2011)APE Music CD
 Ensaio (2013 - recorded in 1992) Warner DVD
 Oswaldo Montenegro e Cia Mulungo (2013) AMZ Midia CD and DVD
 Solidões (film soundtrack) (2013) OM Produções Artísticas - Download
 Me Ensina  Escrever (2014) OM Produções Artísticas - Single
 3x4 (2015) DVD
 A Porta da Alegria (2015) OM Produções Artísticas - Single
 O Perfume da Memória (film soundtrack) (2016) OM Produções Artísticas - digital download

References

External links 

 Oficial page
 Interview in site Alô Música (in Portuguese)

1956 births
Living people
Brazilian film score composers
Musicians from Rio de Janeiro (city)